Pedro Martínez was the defending champion but chose not to defend his title.

Gianluca Mager won the title after defeating Jaume Munar 2–6, 6–3, 6–2 in the final.

Seeds

Draw

Finals

Top half

Bottom half

References

External links
Main draw
Qualifying draw

Andalucía Challenger - 1